Scott Thompson (born April 16, 1971) is an American professional wrestler. He is best known for his appearances with the professional wrestling promotion World Championship Wrestling under the ring name King Kong in the early 1990s and later worked as Krusher Kong on the wrestling independent circuit. Thompson teamed up with another wrestler,  Dwain McCullough, known as Awesome Kong to form a regular tag team known as The Colossal Kongs.

Professional wrestling career
Thompson made his professional wrestling debut on the independent circuit in 1989 working under the ring name Big Hoss Mcalister. Initially he worked for a promotion called World Wrestling Association (WWA) based in New Jersey. In the WWA he formed a tag team with Chief Thunder Mountain and together they became the first holders of the WWA Tag Team Championship in early 1989. On October 21, 1989 they lost the championship to a team called The Motor City Madmen (Al The Sledgehammer & Mike Moore), but regained it on May 5, 1990. The team's second and final run as the WWA Tag Team Champions ended on May 25, 1991 as they were defeated by a team known as "The Lords of Darkness" (Agony and Pain). Thompson had returned briefly to the WWA to drop the titles after having competed in Japan for All Japan Pro Wrestling (AJPW) for several months prior. In AJPW he worked as "Texas Terminator Hoss" or sometimes just "Texas Terminator" and competed in the 1991 Champion Carnival tournament. During the tournament he only earned 2 points by defeating Johnny Ace while losing to Doug Furnas, Stan Hansen, Kenta Kobashi, Dynamite Kid and Mitsuharu Misawa. On April 20, 1991 he defeated TNT for the WWC Television Championship in Bayamón, Puerto Rico and lost it to TNT on June 1, 1991. In 1992, Thompson began working for the Memphis, Tennessee-based United States Wrestling Association (USWA). In the USWA he was known as "Meat", teamed up with another wrestler known as "Potatoes" to for a team called "The Fat Boys". At USWA's Night of Champions, the duo defeated Tony Falk and Jim Steele in the lone highlight for the team.

While in the USWA Thompson became friends with a wrestler known as "The Awesome Kong" and the two decided to form a tag team. Being similar in stature to Awesome Kong Thompson began to wrestle wearing a black wrestling mask as well as growing his beard out as he wrestled as "King Kong", collectively King Kong and Awesome Kong were known as "The Colossal Kongs". In mid-1993 the Kongs worked for Big D Pro Wrestling (BDPW) as well as the Dallas, Texas-based Global Wrestling Federation (GWF). During their tenure in the GWF they were involved in a storyline against the then reigning GWF Tag Team Champion The Ebony Experience (Booker T and Stevie Ray), but never won the championship. In the same year, the team signed with World Championship Wrestling (WCW). In WCW they were managed by Harley Race, the duo competed in WCW's tag team division. Their first real match on a national level took place as Clash of the Champions XXIV where the team lost to Sting and Ric Flair. Later on both of the Colossal Kong's competed in the 1993 Battlebowl tournament part of the WCW Pay Per View (PPV) of the same name. In the tournament King Kong teamed up with Dustin Rhodes to defeat Awesome Kong and The Equalizer, with the storyline being that the teams were "randomly drawn" to face off. Winning the match meant that King Kong was one of 20 wrestlers competing in a battle royal at the end of the night, won by Big Van Vader. King Kong would also work WCW's 1993 Starrcade show, losing to The Shockmaster in a singles match. The PPV loss was one of Thompson's last matches for WCW, after which he returned to the independent circuit in Texas. At this point he had tweaked his ring name outside of WCW to "Krusher Kong" instead of the more generic "King Kong". In Texas he held the NWA Brass Knuckles Championship for 73 days, until he lost it to Eclipse on August 14, 1998. He would later hold the Pro Wrestling Championship (PCW) title in 2001 as well as the Texas Championship Wrestling (later renamed Xtreme Championship Wrestling) singles title and the tag team titles twice in 2003. Kong wrestled his last match in 2010.

Championships and accomplishments
NWA Southwest
NWA Brass Knuckles Championship (1 time)
Professional Championship Wrestling
PCW Heavyweight Championship (1 time)
Pro Wrestling Illustrated
PWI ranked King Kong # 236 of the 500 best singles wrestlers of the PWI 500 in 1993
Texas Championship Wrestling / Xtreme Championship Wrestling
TCW / XCW Heavyweight Championship (2 time)
XCW Tag Team Championship (1 time) - with The Bull
Texas Wrestling Hall of Fame
Class of 2012
World Wrestling Association (New Jersey)
WWA Tag Team Championship (2 times) - with Chief Thunder Mountain
World Wrestling Council
WWC Television Championship (1 time)
Wrestling Observer Newsletter
Worst Tag Team (1993) with Awesome Kong

References

External links
 
 

American male professional wrestlers
Living people
Masked wrestlers
Professional wrestlers from Texas
Sportspeople from Dallas
1957 births
WWC Television Champions